American Gothic is the third studio album by American singer-songwriter David Ackles. It was released on July 4, 1972, by record label Elektra.

Background 

American Gothic was recorded at IBC Sound Recording Studios in London, England. It was produced by Bernie Taupin and conducted by Robert Kirby.

Release 

American Gothic was released on July 4, 1972. The album peaked at number 167 on the Billboard charts.

Reception 

Upon its release, Ramparts called the album "Vivid, lyrical – but at times maudlin and self-indulgent, American Gothic is [Ackles'] best to date". Robert Christgau's review was critical, writing "'I won't get maudlin,' Ackles promises midway into the second side, locking himself in the barn as the dappled stallion gallops to join his brothers and sisters on the open range with his mane flying free in the breeze."

In its retrospective review, AllMusic wrote "American Gothic remains one of those great albums that never found its audience. It waits to be rediscovered."

Legacy 

American Gothic was included in the book 1001 Albums You Must Hear Before You Die. Mojo called it "one of the most beautiful but rarely heard albums of his era".

Track listing 
All tracks composed by David Ackles.
 "American Gothic"
 "Love's Enough"
 "Ballad of the Ship of State"
 "One Night Stand"
 "Oh, California!"
 "Another Friday Night"
 "Family Band"
 "Midnight Carousel"
 "Waiting for the Moving Van"
 "Blues for Billy Whitecloud"
 "Montana Song"

Personnel
Technical
Damon Lyon-Shaw, Hugh Jones - engineer
Robert L. Heimall - art direction
Michael Ross - photography

References

External links 

 

1972 albums
David Ackles albums
Albums conducted by Robert Kirby
Elektra Records albums
Albums recorded at IBC Studios